Hussam bin Saud Al Saud (born 23 May 1960) ( Ḥussam ibn Su'ūd Āl Su'ūd) is a Saudi Arabian politician and businessman who is the governor of Al Bahah Province. He is the son of King Saud, who ruled from 1953 to 1964.

Early life and education

Prince Hussam was born on 23 May 1960. He is the fifty-second son of King Saud, and his mother is Noura bint Abdullah Al Damer.

Prince Hussam has a degree in economics from King Saud University and master's degree in economics from London School of Economics. He also holds a PhD in economic theories of unemployment and its impact on government policies from Birkbeck College  of University of London which he received in 1989.

Career
Prince Hussam is a businessman and has many business activities like Arabian Plastic Compound; NAHL Water Factory in Egypt and Lebanon. He is also the chairman of Saudi-Kuwait Holding, set up to provide investment in both countries. He is the former chairman of Zain Saudi Arabia.

In April 2017 he was named governor of Al Baha province.

Personal life
Prince Hussam is married to Princess Sara bint Musaed bin Abdulaziz, and they have five children. In 2010, one of his sons, Prince Saud bin Hussam, married a daughter of Prince Khalid bin Musaed bin Abdul Rahman in Riyadh.

References

Hussam
Hussam
Hussam
1960 births
Living people
Hussam
Hussam
Hussam